Millville is a town in Sussex County, Delaware, United States. The population in 2020 was 1,825, It is part of the Salisbury, Maryland-Delaware Metropolitan Statistical Area and lies within Baltimore Hundred.

Geography
It is contiguous on the east with Ocean View, and bordered on the north, west and south by unincorporated portions of Sussex County.

Transportation

Roads are the main means of transportation to and from Millville. Delaware Route 26 is the primary state highway serving the town, passing through on an east-west alignment. It heads eastward toward Bethany Beach and west to U.S. Route 113 in Dagsboro. Delaware Route 17 is the other primary highway serving Millville, heading southwestward from its junction with DE 26 just northwest of town, skimming the southwestern edge of town, then traversing rural areas until it reaches Selbyville.

Government

Elected officials
Millville has a council-manager form of government. Under the current governmental structure and electoral system, which went into effect with the election of March 3, 2001, a five-person town council governs the town. After each election, the council elects one of its members to serve as mayor. Another council member serves as deputy mayor, another as treasurer, and another as secretary, while the fifth council member serves as a council member alone with no additional duties. Each council member serves a two-year term, and the terms are staggered so that three of the council members are elected in each odd-numbered year and two in each even-numbered year.

The Annual Municipal Election is held on the first Saturday in March. Anyone 18 years old or older registered to vote in Millville may run for the town council as long as the candidate has lived in Millville for at least 90 days before the date of that years election.

If only one person runs for a particular council seat, that person takes office automatically without any election being held that year for that seat. If no one runs for a particular council seat, the incumbent automatically serves another term without any election being held that year for that seat.

Appointed officials and town operations
A town manager oversees the day-to-day operations of the town. The Delaware State Police provides police service to Millville under a contract with the Town and the Millville Volunteer Fire Company serves Millville, Ocean View, and unincorporated portions of Sussex County as far east as the Assawoman Canal and as almost as far west as Dagsboro; it purchased its first motor-driven firefighting vehicle in 1936 and today operates 16 vehicles.

Sussex County handled all land use regulation in Millville until 1993, when Millville itself began to pass zoning ordinances to control growth.

History
The early settlement of the Millville area by Europeans is poorly recorded, although it is known that the swampy, marshy nature of much of the land of eastern Baltimore Hundred in southeastern Delaware when the first Europeans arrived led them to establish plantations on higher ground in the vicinity of what are now Millville, Ocean View, and Clarksville. Millville itself grew up around a steam-powered sawmill operated by Captain Peter Townshend in the late 19th century, becoming a center for lumber, agricultural products, and commercial fishing.

For a time, the names "Dukestown" and "Dukesville" were considered for the town because of the prominence and number of members of the Dukes family who lived in the area. Eventually, the town was named Millville because of the sorghum mills, lumber mills and grist mills in the area.

Millville was incorporated in 1906. It had a population of 206 at the time, and has grown in population only very slowly since, reaching only 259 by the 2000 census. However, the population more than doubled by the 2010 census, rising to 544 residents, the highest in the recorded history of Millville.

Millville was considered the principal town of Baltimore Hundred, although this today lacks meaning because Delaware's hundreds lost their political functions long ago and now serve only as geographic points of reference.

Notes

References
Town of Millville, Delaware, official web site
ADC Map Book Sussex County, Delaware, 1st Edition. Alexandria Drafting Company: Alexandria, Virginia, 2005.
Meehan, James D. Bethany Beach Memoirs...A Long Look Back. Harold E. Dukes, Jr.: Bethany Beach, Delaware, 1998. .

External links

 http://millville.delaware.gov/

Towns in Sussex County, Delaware
Towns in Delaware
Salisbury metropolitan area